KGBK (96.7 FM, "True Country") is a commercial radio station licensed to serve Larned, Kansas, United States. The station is currently owned by Rocking M Media, LLC.

KGBK broadcasts a classic country music format branded as "True Country". It previously aired the ""Jack FM and "Bob FM" adult hits formats.

The station was assigned the KSOB call sign by the Federal Communications Commission on November 27, 2007.

As part of owner Rocking M Media's bankruptcy reorganization, in which 12 stations in Kansas would be auctioned off to new owners, it was announced on October 31, 2022 that Hutchinson-based Ad Astra Per Aspera Broadcasting was the winning bidder for KSOB, KNNS and Salina-based KVOB for $40,000. While the bankruptcy court has approved the purchase, the sale must be filed to the FCC for approval. Ahead of the closure of the sale, Ad Astra Per Aspera has applied for new KGBK call letters for the station, which took effect on March 1, 2023.

References

External links

 

SOB
Classic country radio stations in the United States
Pawnee County, Kansas
Radio stations established in 1985
1985 establishments in Kansas